Maamanithar or Maamanithan ( Māmaṉitar; great human being or supremely great man) was an honour awarded by the rebel Liberation Tigers of Tamil Eelam in Sri Lanka. The honour was usually awarded to civilians posthumously.

Recipients
 Kasi Ananthan (born 1938), poet.
 A. Chandranehru (1944–2005), politician; conferred 9 February 2005.
 C. J. Eliezer (1918–2001), academic; conferred 19 October 1997.
 Thillainadarajah Jeyakumar (died 2007); conferred March 2007.
 Joseph Pararajasingham (1934–2005), politician; conferred 25 December 2005.
 Kumar Ponnambalam (1940–2000), politician; conferred January 2000.
 Nadarajah Raviraj (1962–2006), politician; conferred 10 November 2006.
 V. Satchithananthasivam (Gnanatharan) (died 2006), journalist; conferred January 2006.
 Kalaignani A. Selvaratnam; conferred 1991.
 S. Sivamaharajah (1938–2006), politician and publisher; conferred 22 August 2006.
 K. Sivanesan (1957–2008), politician; conferred 7 March 2008.
 Taraki Sivaram (1959–2005), journalist; conferred 30 April 2005.
 Marusaleen Soosainayagam (Naavannan) (died 2006), poet; conferred 15 April 2007.
 A. Thurairajah (1934–1994), academic.
 Vanniasingham Vigneswaran (died 2006); conferred April 2006.

References

External links